In Japanese mythology, the  are the seven generations of kami that emerged after the formation of heaven and earth.

According to the Kojiki, these deities appeared after the Kotoamatsukami. The first two generations were hitorigami while the five that followed came into being as male-female pairs of kami: male deities and sisters that were at the same time married couples. In total the Kamiyonanayo consist of 12 deities in this chronicle.

In contrast, the chronicle Nihon Shoki, points out that this group was the first to appear after the creation of the universe. It also states that the first three generations of deities were hitorigami and that the other generations of deities were pairs of the opposite sex. Finally the Nihon Shoki uses a different spelling for the names of all deities.

The last generation formed by Izanagi and Izanami were the couple that would be responsible for the creation of the Japanese archipelago (Kuniumi) and would engender other deities (Kamiumi).

List of deities

See also
 Shinto
 List of Japanese deities

References

Bibliography

Japanese mythology
Shinto kami
Creation myths
Amatsukami